Madden Army Airfield is a former United States Army Air Forces World War II air base on Panama as part of the defense of the Panama Canal.  The airfield was built to defend Madden Lake and Dam.    The 24th Fighter Squadron (XXVI Fighter Command) was assigned to the station from 8  March to 15 August, 1944, flying P-39 Airacobras.

References

 Maurer, Maurer (1983). Air Force Combat Units Of World War II. Maxwell AFB, Alabama: Office of Air Force History. .

External links

Airfields of the United States Army Air Forces in Panama